Equipo Continental Supergiros is a Colombian UCI Continental cycling team founded in 2010. In 2020, the team upgraded from amateur status to Continental.

Team roster

Major wins 

2016
 Overall Vuelta a Colombia, Mauricio Ortega
Stages 6 (ITT) & 7, Mauricio Ortega
2017
Stage 7 Vuelta a Colombia, José Serpa
2020
Stage 1 Vuelta a Colombia, Bernardo Suaza

References

External links
 

UCI Continental Teams (America)
Cycling teams established in 2010
Cycling teams based in Colombia